Paleodicraeia is a monotypic genus of flowering plants belonging to the family Podostemaceae. The only species is Paleodicraeia imbricata.

Its native range is Madagascar.

References

Podostemaceae
Monotypic Malpighiales genera